Controlled Developments is an EP by drum and bass artists Source Direct, which was released November 4, 1997. The album is composed entirely of previously released singles

Track listing
"Call & Response" – 7:15
 "Computer State" – 7:39
 "Black Domina" – 7:34
 "Enemy Lines" – 8:03
 "Two Masks" – 7:05
 "Capital D" – 7:41

In popular culture
The track, "Call & Response", appeared in a scene from the 1998 film Blade in which the track is being listened to, on headphones, by the villain, Deacon Frost (Stephen Dorff), whilst he searches a library's archives. However, the song did not appear on the film's soundtrack.

References

Source Direct albums
1997 EPs
Astralwerks EPs